Turan Uzun (born 31 July 1969) is a retired Turkish football defender.

Honours
Kocaelispor
Turkish Cup: 1996–97

References

1969 births
Living people
Turkish footballers
Beşiktaş J.K. footballers
Kocaelispor footballers
Dardanelspor footballers
Association football defenders